The Gold Coast is the largest regional city and fastest growing city in Australia. As a result, the Gold Coast has a wide range of public and private transport options from cars and bikes to buses, heavy rail and light rail. The car is the dominant mode of transport in the city with an extensive arterial road network that connects the standard residential streets with major suburbs and motorways.

Public Transport on the Gold Coast is managed by the Queensland Government's Department of Transport and Main Roads, while Translink coordinates the Transport network in South East Queensland.

Walking and Cycling

Behaviour change 
Active travel is the brand for Gold Coast behaviour change programs for encouraging sustainable transport. Enjoy the way you move is the tag line that rewards those already walking and cycling and encourages reflection on behaviour change for anyone who doesn't enjoy traffic jams.

Walking 
The Gold Coast has extensive paths one of which is called the Gold Coast Oceanway which is a  network of pathways along the coastline. Locals residents and visitors alike often walk to the beach, shops or anywhere nearby, particularly so in areas of high-density living.

The development of the national park tracks and accommodation at Binna Burra Lodge owe a great deal to the work of Romeo Lahey and Arthur Groom in the 1920s and 1930s.

Cycling
The Gold Coast is largely flat providing excellent opportunities for cycling, most major road corridors have dedicated cycle lanes located on the roads. The river corridors provide opportunities to link west from the Gold Coast Oceanway out to the hinterland. The V1 is an emerging cycle route along the M1 motorway corridor from Smith Street, Gaven to the Logan River at Beenleigh. In the future it will be extended southwards along the M1 corridor through Nerang, Robina, Varsity Lakes, West Burleigh, Palm Beach and behind the Gold Coast Airport to the New South Wales state border.

The Gold Coast City Council has taken action in recent years to promote active travel. Mobike is a bike sharing company that operates in the city under contract from the council. Rather than only being able to access bikes from designated locations, this scheme allows people to borrow a bike wherever there is one available, and ride it to the desired destination without the need to return it to a 'docking station'. However, users can access up to 34 preferred bike parking areas known as 'Mobike Preferred Locations'. These areas are conveniently located beside key transport interchanges and existing city infrastructure, and they are easily identified by Mobike signs and ground markings.

Road network

The Gold Coast main mode of transport is by private vehicles which has resulted in the city having an extensive road network for an Australian regional city. Gold Coast's road are managed by all three level of Governments.

The Australian Federal Government is responsible for the maintaining the Pacific Motorway (M1), the city's main thoroughfare and a recognised nation freight route. Pacific Motorway commences in the Brisbane CBD and travels south passing through the western suburbs of the Gold Coast and continues on through Northern New South Wales.

Department of Transport and Main Roads, A division of the Queensland Government manages all state regionsied routes throughout Queensland. State designated routes can be identified by a white number inside a blue shield. The Gold Coast state routes typically commence from the Pacific Motorway and connect with major commercial and residential hubs. State roads travelling in a north to south direction will be designated in single digits where as state roads travelling in an east to west direction will be designated in double digits.

The suburban road network is maintained by the Gold Coast City Council.

Public Transport 
Gold Coast's public transport system consists of heavy rail, buses and light rail.

TransLink is a division of the Department of Transport and Main Roads that manages the planning, co-ordination, integrated ticketing and zoning for public transport services covering Brisbane and the rest of South East Queensland. It contracts Queensland Rail, Surfside Buslines and Keolis Downer (Gold Coast light rail operator) to operate public transport services in allocated operating areas for a negotiated price, and keeps all fare receipts. Passengers pay common fares, based on the number of zones travelled through, on all the public transport modes covered including trains, buses and light rail, irrespective of who operates the service. In 2007, TransLink introduced the go card smartcard-based ticketing system. Paper tickets are still available, but travel using the go card costs significantly less than using a paper ticket.

Rail services are operated by Queensland Rail which provides Citytrain services on the Gold Coast Railway line from the southern terminus in Varsity Lakes on the Gold Coast to Brisbane Airport via Brisbane City. Light Rail services are operated by Keolis Downer (branded as G:link) which operate a single 20 kilometre line from Broadbeach South to Helensvale via the key activity precincts of Surfers Paradise and Southport. Surfside Buslines under contract from Translink provides an extensive bus network of 56 bus routes that includes high frequency and suburban services.

After some years of decline, the Gold Coast public transport system is being revitalised and finding greater patronage, with significant investment in light rail construction and extensions, a completely reorganised and simplified bus network.

Buses

Surfside Buslines operates its Queensland services under the Translink integrated public transport scheme. Translink is responsible for all timetabling and ticketing while Surfside provides the bus service, covering the majority of the city.

Buses generally operate on a 05:00 to midnight timetable throughout the week, with some Friday and Saturday night 24-hour services.

Rail

Heavy Rail

Due to the city's close proximity to Brisbane it is included in Brisbane's CityTrain network with an interurban Gold Coast railway line commencing in Central station and traveling southbound running express between Park Road and Beenleigh stations stopping only at Altandi and Loganlea. After departing from Beenleigh the line stops at all Gold Coast stations largely running adjacent to the Pacific Motorway (M1) before terminating in Gold Coast suburb of Varsity Lakes. It takes approximately 100 minutes to travel from Central railway station in the Brisbane Central Business District to Varsity Lakes railway station. Much of the line was built as single track in the 1990s but has gradually been duplicated with the last section of duplication completed in 2017.

Light Rail

The Gold Coast is one of the fastest-growing cities in Australia with travel demands exceeding population growth. In order to tackle congestion effectively, there is a need to squeeze much more capacity from existing corridors. The G:link is a 20 km light rail system opened in 2014 operating from Broadbeach South to Helensvale. The G:link provides the suburbs of Broadbeach, Surfers Paradise, Main Beach, Southport, Parkwood and Helensvale with a modern and high frequency transport system. The light rail operates at a high frequency with services every 8 minutes in peak times and 15 minutes in off-peak during weekdays and every 10 minutes on the weekends. The system is expected to encourage visitors and residents to use public transport to reduce major traffic congestion and pollution problems.

Gold Coast City Council is planning for a third stage of the line  that would extend south from connecting to Burleigh Heads. The proposed 6.6 kilometre southern extension of the light rail line will continue southbound from the existing Broadbeach South station to Burleigh Heads with eight new light rail stations with Burleigh Heads being the new southern terminus for the line. The exact location and names of the new stations will be released in late 2018 with the Detailed Business Case. It is estimated that the Burleigh Heads extension will cost approximately $670 million with construction commencing in 2020 and taking three years to complete.

Major Transport Hubs 
There are several major transport hubs on the Gold Coast that offer connecting services to the Light Rail, Bus and Heavy Rail network.

Major transport hubs include;

 Tweed Mall Shopping centre, located in adjacent town of Tweed Heads in New South Wales offers connecting bus services to Surfside Buslines New South Wales services. 
 Varsity Lakes railway station, offers connecting services to the Gold Coast railway line and bus connections to southern suburbs.
 Broadbeach South bus and light rail interchange, offers connecting G:link light rail services and bus connections to western and southern suburbs.
 Robina Railway station, offers connecting train and bus services to Eastern suburbs.
 Nerang Railway station, offers connecting train and bus services to Eastern suburbs
 Southport bus and light rail interchange, provides a G:link and bus interchange for the Gold Coast Central Business District. 
 Helensvale Light and Heavy Rail Interchange, provides Queensland's first tri-model interchange, providing connecting services to the train, bus and light rail network.
 Ormeau railway station, provides connecting bus services to northern Gold Coast suburbs as well the City of Logan which forms part of the Greater Brisbane Metropolitan area.

Airports 
Due to the Gold Coast's close proximity to Brisbane, the city has two international airports servicing the Gold Coast.

Gold Coast Airport 
The Gold Coast Airport serves domestic and international destinations which services the City of Gold Coast and the Northern Rivers Region of New South Wales. The entrance to the airport is situated in the suburb of Bilinga of the Gold Coast Highway while the runway itself straddles the state border of Queensland and New South Wales. During summer, these states are in two different time zones. The Gold Coast Airport operates on Queensland Time all year round (year-round AEST / UTC+10).

For the 2015–16 financial year, Gold Coast Airport exceeded 6 million passengers. It is the sixth-busiest airport in Australia, and the busiest outside a state capital, in terms of passengers, and eighth-busiest in aircraft movements. It is also the third-fastest-growing airport in the country.

Brisbane Airport 
Brisbane Airport is the primary domestic and international airport servicing South East Queensland. Brisbane Airport is located in Queensland's state capital of Brisbane and is only a one-hour drive from the Gold Coast CBD in Southport to the Airport. The airport services 31 airlines flying to 50 domestic and 29 international destinations, in total amounting in more than 22.9 million passengers who travelled through the airport in 2017.

The airport has two railway stations as part of a privately owned airport rail line. The international terminal railway station is elevated and located next to the international terminal, as is the domestic railway station. The Airtrain Citylink travels via the Queensland Rail City network to Brisbane CBD, trains continuing to the Gold Coast, terminating at Varsity Lakes.

Historic 

The South Coast Railway Line was a railway line that connected the towns of the South Coast region (now known as the City of the Gold Coast) with Brisbane, the state capital. The Beenleigh railway line was opened in 1885 with a further 42 kilometer extension being completed to Southport in 1889. The initial stretch from Beenleigh included stations at Yatala, Ormeau, Pimpama, Coomera, Oxenford, Helensvale, Coombabah, Ernest Junction and Southport. An extension from Southport to Queensland/ New South Wales border town of Tweed Heads was completed in 1903. The extension included an extra 11 stations to towns like Nerang and Coolangatta before finally terminating in Tweed Heads.

Passenger trains ran from South Brisbane to Southport with connecting trains from Ernest Junction or Southport to Tweed Heads. Picnic and excursion trains ran through from South Brisbane to Tweed Heads on Sundays.

Due to the popularity of the motor car in the 1950s and political interest in funding road transport, the Tweed Heads stretch of the line was closed in 1961 with the Southport line closing itself in 1964. For over 30 years since closure of the South Coast line in 1964 the closest railway station for the Gold Coast was in Beenleigh. A new railway line following a different alignment adjacent to the Pacific Motorway called the Gold Coast railway line was finally constructed with the first stage completed to Helensvale in 1996, once again giving the growing city of the Gold Coast a rail connection to Brisbane.

Future Infrastructure 
Gold Coast is one of the fastest-growing cities in Australia and this has caused a growing problem with congestion, with much of the existing road network approaching capacity. All three levels of government in Australia have been exploring options to reduce congestion on Gold Coast roads and to reduce travel time.

Pacific Motorway upgrade 
The Pacific Motorway is one Australia's busiest highways and is a national freight route, it is estimated that up to 155, 000 vehicles use the Gold Coast section of the motorway each that with this figure forecasted to rise. The Queensland State Government and Australian Federal Government are jointly working together to upgrade the Pacific Motorway.

Mudgeeraba to Varsity Lakes 
The Australian Federal Government and Queensland State Government are currently working together to widen 5.7 kilometers of Pacific Motorway from 2 lanes to 3 lanes in each direction between Mudgeeraba to Varsity Lakes. The project is expected to be completed by mid – 2020.

Varsity Lakes – Tugun 
The widening and upgrade of the Pacific Motorway between Varsity Lakes and Tugun is currently in the planning stages with the project estimated to cost around 1.036 billion to complete.

Gold Coast Light Rail extension 
There is currently strong political support for the G:link light rail system to be extended south to the Gold Coast Airport with Gold Coast City Council endorsing support for the extension to the airport in 2016.

Stage 3A – Burleigh Heads extension 
An extension form the existing Broadbeach South terminus to Burleigh Heads is currently being planned. A 6.6 kilometer extension with 8 new light rail stations are proposed with the line running down the middle of the Gold Coast Highway, reducing minimal disruptions to the existing road corridor. Queensland State Government and City of Gold Coast have  committed $5 million each in developing a Detailed Business Case that will analyse the costs and options for stage 3A.

Stage 3B – Gold Coast Airport extension 
The Gold Coast City Council released a list of potential routes for stage three in November 2015 and invited public comment. Ideas included a southern extension from Broadbeach South to Burleigh Heads, two options from Nobby Beach to Robina station, from Varsity Lakes station to Burleigh Heads, from Varsity Lakes station to Gold Coast Airport and two options from Burleigh Heads to Gold Coast Airport. 3606 people responded to the survey. Nearly 80 percent supported an extension to Burleigh Heads and 70 percent also supported a further extension to the airport.

The council's Gold Coast City Transport Strategy 2031 supports a future expansion to the airport. The 14 kilometer extension of the light rail line from the proposed Burleigh Heads station would continue south along the Gold Coast Highway, passing through the southern suburbs of Palm Beach and Tugun before terminating at the Airport.

Heavy Rail extension 
There have been numerous proposal over the years to extend the existing railway corridor from Varsity Lakes to the Gold Coast Airport. The Queensland Government's Department of Transport and Main Roads completed planning for a proposed extension to the airport in 2005 with additional planning undertaken in 2009 to establish a preferred corridor. The first stage was completed to Varsity Lakes station was completed in 2009 but the second stage has been meet with a number of setbacks and budget constraints. The Queensland Government still plans to extend the line with stations proposed at Tallebudgera, Elanora, Tugun and the Gold Coast Airport however the state government is not likely to start construction till after the Brisbane's Cross River Rail project is completed in 2024 to increase South East Queensland rail network capacity.

See also

 Bus transport in Queensland
 Transportation in Australia
 Rail transport in Queensland

References

External links
TransLink – Public transport – bus train ferry
Department of Transport and Main Roads 
Gold Coast City Council Transport Page
Government of Queensland's transport vision for South East Queensland 2031
Gold Coast light rail